The 2003–04 Greek Football Cup was the 62nd edition of the Greek Football Cup. That season's edition was entitled "Vodafone Greek Cup".

Calendar

Knockout phase
Each tie in the knockout phase, apart from the final, was played over two legs, with each team playing one leg at home. The team that scored more goals on aggregate over the two legs advanced to the next round. If the aggregate score was level, the away goals rule was applied, i.e. the team that scored more goals away from home over the two legs advanced. If away goals were also equal, then extra time was played. The away goals rule was again applied after extra time, i.e. if there were goals scored during extra time and the aggregate score was still level, the visiting team advanced by virtue of more away goals scored. If no goals were scored during extra time, the winners were decided by a penalty shoot-out. In the final, which were played as a single match, if the score was level at the end of normal time, extra time was played, followed by a penalty shoot-out if the score was still level.The mechanism of the draws for each round is as follows:
There are no seedings, and teams from the same group can be drawn against each other.

First round
The draw took place on 24 July 2003.

|}

Bracket

Second round

||colspan="2" rowspan="6" 

|}

Round of 16

|}

Quarter-finals

|}

Semi-finals

Summary

|}

Matches

Panathinaikos won 3–2 on aggregate.

Olympiacos won 4–1 on aggregate.

Final

References

External links
Greek Cup 2003-2004 at RSSSF
Greek Cup 2003-2004 at Hellenic Football Federation's official site

Greek Football Cup seasons
Greek Cup
Cup